is a Japanese cooking manga series written by Zenta Abe and illustrated by Yoshimi Kurata. The series chronicles the lives of the staff and customers of a restaurant called Fujimura, owned by veteran chef Kumano. It was published by Shogakukan in Big Comic Superior from 1986 to 1999. After the death of Abe in 1999, other series have been released with other writers. The sixth series, Aji Ichi Monme: Tsugi Aji, began in 2018. In 1999, Aji Ichi Monme won the 44th Shogakukan Manga Award in the General category.

Publication
Aji Ichi Monme is written by Zenta Abe and illustrated by Yoshimi Kurata. The manga was first serialized in Shogakukan's Big Comic Original Zōkan in 1986, and was transferred in 1987 to Big Comic Superior, where it ran until 1999. Shogakukan compiled its chapters into thirty-three tankōbon volumes, published from May 30, 1986, to September 1, 1999.

After the death of Abe in 1999, Yukie Fukuda served as the series writer, and a sequel, titled , was serialized in Big Comic Superior from 1999 to 2008. Shogakukan compiled its chapters into twenty-one tankōbon volumes, released from January 29, 2000, to March 28, 2008.

A third series, titled , was serialized in Big Comic Superior from 2008 to 2013. Shogakukan compiled its chapters into ten tankōbon volumes, released from September 30, 2008, to April 30, 2013.

A fourth series, titled , was serialized in Big Comic Superior from 2013 to 2016. Shogakukan compiled its chapters into six tankōbon volumes, released from October 30, 2013, to May 30, 2016.

A fifth series, titled  was serialized in Big Comic Superior from 2016 to 2017. It was written by Rei Hanagata instead of Yukie Fukuda. Shogakukan compiled its chapters into two tankōbon volumes, released on December 28, 2016, and July 28, 2017. An extra publication, titled , was serialized in Big Comic Superior from 2017 to 2018. Each chapter features a guest manga artist. Shogakukan compiled its chapters into three tankōbon volumes, released from October 30, 2017, to September 28, 2018. A short series, titled  was serialized in Big Comic Superior in 2018.

A sixth series, titled , has been serialized in Big Comic Superior since 2018. The series is written in collaboration with Rokuro Kube. Shogakukan has compiled its chapters into individual tankōbon volumes. The first volume was published on June 28, 2019. As of November 30, 2022, nine volumes have been published.

Reception
In 1999, the series won the 44th Shogakukan Manga Award in the General category.

References

External links 
 

1986 manga
1999 manga
2008 manga
2013 manga
2016 manga
2018 manga
Cooking in anime and manga
Seinen manga
Shogakukan manga
Winners of the Shogakukan Manga Award for general manga